Sem Controle (No Control) also known as The Last Madness, is a 2007 Brazilian drama thriller film directed by Cris D'amato and starring Eduardo Moscovis, Milena Toscano, Vanessa Gerbelli and Renata Batista. The film was screened at the Première Brasil of the 2007 Festival do Rio.

Plot
Danilo is a theatre director obsessed with the injustice committed against the farmer Manoel da Motta Coqueiro, in a case that initiated the process of extinction of the death penalty in Brazil. Spurred by a mysterious, beautiful woman, Danilo begins to rehearse a play about the life of Motta Coqueiro, where he plays the farmer, and the remaining characters are experienced by psychiatric patients. Gradually Danilo begins to confuse what is real and what is imaginary, passing to relive the historical facts as if he himself were Motta Coqueiro.

Cast

 Eduardo Moscovis as Danilo / Motta Coqueiro
 Milena Toscano as Aline / Úrsula das Virgens
 Vanessa Gerbelli as Dr. Márcia
 Renata Batista as Ana
 Josias Amon as Tonhão / Carlos / Tinoco
 Edmilson Barros as Edmilson / Benedito
 Mariana Bassoul as Vânia / Francisca
 Charles Fricks as André / Julião
 Cadu Fávero as Claudionor / Fernandes
 Dirce Migliaccio as Dona Iolanda
 Shimon Nahmias as Godofredo / Flor
 Igor Paiva as Otávio / Policeman
 Polyana Passos as Heloísa / Balbina
 Gláucia Rodrigues as Estela / Carolina
 Pablo Sanábio as Felipe / Fidélis / Paulinho

References

External links
 
 

Brazilian thriller drama films
2007 thriller drama films
2007 directorial debut films
2007 films
2007 drama films
2000s Portuguese-language films